Jennifer Fallon (born 1959) is an Australian author of fantasy and science fiction. She is also a businesswoman, trainer and business consultant.

Jennifer has a master's degree from the Creative Arts faculty of QUT. A computer trainer and application specialist in her "day job", Jennifer currently works in the IT industry and spends a month each year working at Scott Base in Antarctica.

Biography
Jennifer Fallon was born in Melbourne, Australia and after living in Central Australia for a number of years, now resides in the South Island of New Zealand. She has sold over 750,000 books world-wide, including three trilogies and one tetralogy.

She is published by Snapping Turtle Books worldwide, in addition to some titles through Voyager Books in Australia, Tor and Random House in the United States, Orbit in the United Kingdom, AST in Russia, Heyne and Egmont in Germany and Luitingh Fantasy in the Netherlands. She has also co-authored a tie-in novel, Stargate SG-1: Roswell.

Bibliography
Note: In the US and Canada, The Demon Child and Hythrun Chronicles have been marketed under the same series, The Hythrun Chronicles.

The Demon Child Trilogy
Medalon (2000)
Treason Keep (2001)
Harshini (2001)

The Second Sons Trilogy
Lion of Senet (2002)
Eye of the Labyrinth (2003)
Lord of the Shadows (2003)

The Hythrun Chronicles
Wolfblade (2004)
Warrior (2004)
Warlord (2005)

The Tide Lords
The Immortal Prince (2007)
Gods of Amyrantha (2007)
The Palace of Impossible Dreams (2008)
The Chaos Crystal (2008)

Rift Runners
The Undivided (2011)
Dark Divide (2012)
Reunion (2013)

Lyre Thief Trilogy
 The Lyre Thief (2016)
 Retribution (2017)
 Covenant (TBA)
 Brakandaran the Halfbreed (TBA)

Other
Stargate SG-1: Roswell (2007) (coauthored with Sonny Whitelaw)

Short stories
Stories are featured in the following anthologies:
Baggage (2010) edited by Gillian Polack "MacReadie V The Love Machine"
More Tales of Zorro "Yours and Mine" (2009)
Australia's Legends of Fantasy (2009) edited by Jack Dann and Jonathan Strahan "The Magic Word"
Chicks In Capes "Diary of a Superchick" (2010)

References

Sources
Jennifer Fallon's Homepage
Bibliography of works at Fantastic Fiction

External links
Jennifer Fallon's Homepage
Jennifer Fallon interview at SFFWorld.com
Jennifer Fallon interview at Shades of Sentience

Australian women novelists
1959 births
Living people
Australian fantasy writers
20th-century Australian novelists
Women science fiction and fantasy writers
20th-century Australian women writers